In Major League Baseball (MLB), the Player of the Month Award is given monthly during the regular season to two outstanding players, one each in the National League (NL) and American League (AL). The NL first awarded the honor during the  season, when league president Warren Giles conducted a poll of media members covering the then-eight NL teams and awarded winners an engraved desk set. The AL did not issue its own award until . Pitchers have not been eligible for the Player of the Month Award since then.

Awards by month
Players listed with multiple occurrences are denoted in parentheses:

The most Player of the Month awards won by a single player has been 13 by Barry Bonds. He is followed by Alex Rodriguez (10), Frank Thomas (8), Albert Pujols (7) and Albert Belle (7).

Source:

See also

List of MLB awards

Notes

References

Player of the Month
Awards established in 1958